Thomas Edward Llamas (born July 2, 1979) is an American journalist who was the weekend anchor for World News Tonight on ABC from 2014 to 2021. He left ABC News for rival NBC News, with his last ABC broadcast being on January 31, 2021. On May 3, 2021, he officially joined NBC as Senior National Correspondent and anchor for NBC News Now, hosting Top Story with Tom Llamas, as well as being a fill-in & substitute anchor for Today, and NBC Nightly News, He has won multiple Emmy Awards for his reporting, as well as two Edward R. Murrow awards.

Early life
Llamas was born in Miami, Florida, on July 2, 1979, to Cuban immigrants who had fled the island as political refugees. He attended The Belen Jesuit Preparatory School in Miami. He is a graduate of Loyola University in New Orleans, Louisiana, and was a member of the LA Gamma chapter of Sigma Phi Epsilon. He received bachelor's degrees in Broadcast Journalism and Drama and Speech which he completed in May 2001.

Career
Llamas began his broadcasting career in 2000 with the NBC News Specials Unit and moved to MSNBC where he worked from 2000 to 2005 and covered mostly politics. After that he moved to NBC's WTVJ in Miami. Llamas moved to New York and joined WNBC and NBC News in 2009 as general-assignment reporter and anchor.

In September 2014, he moved to ABC News as a New York-based correspondent and substituted for David Muir on ABC World News Tonight over the Christmas 2014 period. In 2015, Llamas became the Sunday anchor of ABC World News Tonight. He became the sole weekend anchor in January 2017.

During the 2016 U.S. Presidential Campaign, Llamas spent the year reporting on the Republican candidates. He criticized the use by Jeb Bush and Donald Trump of the term "anchor baby" and was called a "sleaze" by Trump after questioning him about the amount of money he had donated to charity.

In January 2021, it was reported that Llamas would leave ABC News and return to NBC News. His last broadcast on ABC News was on January 31, 2021. In April 2021, it was announced that Llamas was named senior national correspondent for NBC News and will anchor a primetime newscast for NBC News Now.

On March 28, 2022, a rebroadcast of that evening's Top Story with Tom Llamas was added to NBC's overnight schedule on weeknights, replacing a replay of Todays fourth hour.

Awards
Llamas has won several awards including an Emmy Award for "Best Anchor" and "Best Hard News Story" and a regional Edward R. Murrow Award for WNBC-TV's coverage of Hurricane Sandy.

His first Emmy was awarded in 2008 for his reporting as the first TV journalist to work on a human smuggling interdiction at sea with the U.S. Coast Guard. He won an Emmy Award in 2013 for his coverage of Hurricane Irene.

References

1979 births
Living people
ABC News personalities
American people of Cuban descent
American television news anchors
American television reporters and correspondents
Loyola University New Orleans alumni
NBC News people